Cesarina Ricci de Tingoli was an Italian composer of the Baroque period.

Life and career
She was related to the family of Cardinal Giovanni Ricci (1497–1574) by birth, and the noble family of Tingoli by marriage. Ruggiero Giovannelli might have been her teacher.

She published Il Primo libro de madrigali a cinque voci, con un dialogo a otto novamente composti & dati in luce in Venice in 1597, which is a composition known as a madrigal. This collection includes 20 madrigals, and is dedicated to Monsignore il Cardinale San Giorgio, the Cardinal Cinzio Aldobrandini. It survives in two partbooks and a manuscript tablature also survives. The cantus and quintus partbooks do not survive. Il primo libro contains 14 five-voice madrigals and an eight-voice dialogue by Ricci, and two madrigals by Alberto Ghirlinzoni, who is only known from this publication. The texts are by Torquato Tasso, Giovanni Battista Guarini, and Antonio Ongaro, all of whom were associated with the academy of Cardinal Cinzio Aldobrandini.

Yale University's Beinecke Rare Book & Manuscript Library acquired a first edition of her work in 2002.

References

Sources
 
  

Italian Baroque composers
Italian women classical composers
Renaissance composers
1570s births
Year of death unknown
Italian Renaissance people
17th-century Italian composers
17th-century Italian women
17th-century women composers